Before the start of protests, hostilities and conflicts and the start of the devastating Civil war in Syria in 2011, citizens of many Asian, European, African and American countries could visit Syrian Arab Republic without a visa or get a visa on arrival, gradually Syria began to cancel visa-free entry and visa on arrival for many countries, and in 2014 the Syrian authorities officially announced the introduction of a visa regime for all countries. However, until now, citizens of some states can de facto enter Syria without a visa or receive a visa on arrival. The visa policy of Syria is now extremely unstable, and there is no exact data on the visa policy of this country. This data is taken from open sources and may become outdated or irrelevant. When entering Syria, the Syrian authorities ask to obtain a Syrian visa in advance by contacting one of the 
country's diplomatic missions in the world.

Map of the visa policy of Syria

Visa not required 

Despite the official statements of the Syrian government that since 2014, citizens of absolutely all countries must obtain a visa in advance to enter Syria, citizens of the following countries are de facto allowed to enter Syria without a visa:

Citizens of the following countries de facto can also visit Syria without a visa, but most often some of them are denied entry and asked to obtain a visa in advance:

Only female citizens of these countries can de facto visit Syria without a visa:
  Morocco

Citizens of the following countries who are non-residents (non-permanent residents) of their countries can de facto enter Syria without a visa, or for transit to a third country:

  Iraq
  Libya
  Somalia

Visa on arrival 
Until 2014, citizens of the former Soviet republics of the USSR (excluding the Baltic republics), Iran, some Asian, African, European, American countries, and almost all countries of the Arab world did not need a visa to enter Syria. According to IATA, which provides information provided by national governments, despite the Syrian government's officially stated need to obtain a visa in advance, a visa on arrival is still de facto valid for citizens of Armenia, Azerbaijan, Belarus, Egypt, Iran, Kazakhstan, Kyrgyzstan, Russia, Tajikistan, Turkmenistan and Uzbekistan, but after the intensification of the Civil war, some citizens of these countries are denied a visa on arrival “for security reasons” and ask citizens of these countries to obtain a Syrian visa in advance:

Until 2015 and until 2020, citizens of  Ukraine and  Moldova could also get a visa on arrival. But due to the “pro-Western and anti-Russian positions” of these two countries, the visa on arrival was discontinued (see Euromaidan and 2020 Moldovan presidential election). Until 2018, сitizens of  Georgia could also obtain a visa on arrival, but after the rupture of diplomatic relations between the two countries on the initiative of Georgia due to the recognition of Abkhazia and South Ossetia by Syria, Georgian citizens must obtain a Syrian visa in advance.

Admission refused 
Entry and transit into the Syria will be denied to holders of passports or other travel documents of all countries containing a visa, or an entry/exit stamp of Israel, or any information that a person has ever been to Israel, or an indication of any connection with the State of Israel.

Also, despite friendly relations, citizens of the  State of Palestine are almost always denied entry to Syria “for reasons of national security”, and holders of the Palestinian Authority passport are asked in advance to obtain a special permit to enter Syria.

Also, Syrian Arab Republic does not recognize the passports of citizens of the Kosovo, Northern Cyprus, Somaliland, Artsakh (or Nagorno-Karabakh) and Transnistria.

  State of Israel
  Turkish Republic of Northern Cyprus
  Republic of Kosovo
  Republic of Somaliland
  Republic of Artsakh
  Transnistrian Moldavian Republic

After the recognition of partially recognized  Republic of Abkhazia and  Republic of South Ossetia — the State of Alania by Syrian Arab Republic in May 2018, citizens of these countries can enter Syria by obtaining a visa.

Statistics 
Before the outbreak of the Syrian civil war in 2011, Syria was one of the most popular tourist destinations in the Middle East. Tourism and the entry of foreigners into Syria in general began to develop especially since the late 1990s. Foreigners entered Syria not only to visit relatives or friends, but also for tourism, medical treatment and pilgrimage to Islamic and Christian sites, as well as for trade, as Syria became an important trading hub for the surrounding countries. Syria was popular especially for citizens of Turkey, Iran, almost all countries of the Arab world, Europe and South Asia, as well as for almost all countries of the Post-Soviet space as a budget travel option and a shopping point for merchants.

By country 
The list does not include Russian citizens who entered Syria through third countries, as well as through the uncontrolled borders of Syria by the official government of the Syrian Arab Republic. Especially between 2011 and 2016, the real number of Russian citizens who entered Syria was several times more.

See also

Visa requirements for Syrian citizens

References

Syria
Foreign relations of Syria